Rasbora labiosa, the slender rasbora, lives in rivers and streams in parts of India. It was first described from the Darna River in the upper Godavari River Basin

References

Rasboras
Taxa named by Dev Dev Mukerji
Fish described in 1935